Matthew J. Ferguson (born 1 October 1984) is a former Australian rules footballer in the Australian Football League (AFL).

He was recruited as the number 22 draft pick in the 2002 AFL Draft from Gippsland. He made his debut for St Kilda in Round 12, 2003 against Port Adelaide.

After being delisted at the end of the 2006 season following just eight games in four seasons, he was given a second chance when redrafted in the 2006 AFL Draft.

He was recalled to the side for the clash with West Coast in Round 21, 2007, after having missed selection in 44 consecutive matches.

Ferguson took a huge screamer against Melbourne in Round 10, 2008 to receive a nomination for Mark of the Year.

External links

1984 births
Living people
St Kilda Football Club players
Australian rules footballers from Victoria (Australia)
Gippsland Power players
Sale Football Club players
St Mary's Football Club (NTFL) players
Perth Football Club players
Casey Demons players